School № 50 is the school of Russian and Ukrainian languages of instruction.

Located in the city of Lviv, street Komaryntsya, 2.

History 
 "High School number 50 with the Russian language teaching" was opened on September 2, 1952 and in the streets Guards, near Academy of Land Forces, which largely determined the contingent of students. The building of the present school was built in 1928 on money Austrian Minister D. Abrahamovych. Before founding the school in 1952 the building housed a school building established in 1921.Near the school are also two parks Park of Culture and Stryiskyi Park and the monument to Soviet soldiers who died in Second World War.
 The 1956 school is named after the famous teacher Anton Makarenko.
 In 1962 its second building was opened, which housed the elementary school.
 In the 1990s, was mixed Russian-Ukrainian.

The school introduced a special course of museum pedagogy.

Progress 

One of the first graduates was future world champion, double Olympic bronze medalist from the long jump Igor Ter-Hovhannisyan, which in years was engaged in DYUSSH number 2 at the school.

In 2005 and 2008 School team became the winner of Chemists young Ukrainian tournament (in Kyiv and Yevpatoria, respectively).

In the summer of 2009, 11-student class Neschadin Andrew won a bronze medal at the International Chemistry Olympiad in London

Interesting Facts  
 School House was built in 1928, although the Soviet government claimed that it was built in 1952.
 School number 50 is the first Russian-language schools in the Western Ukraine.
 Near the school since 1950 there is shelter, which is connected by underground passages of the bomb shelters on the street. Elderly and street. Hvardiys'ka.
 In place of the school of the 17th century to the 19th century, there were military bastions. For schemes they were connected by underground passages of the citadel. Alleged that the move was used in World War II, and as there are today.
 It is alleged that on-site primary school was a German bunker.

Educational institutions established in 1952
Schools in Ukraine
Education in Lviv Oblast
Secondary schools in Ukraine
1952 establishments in the Soviet Union